Four warships of the U.S. Navy have been  named the USS Texas for the State of Texas:

  was a pre-dreadnought battleship that was in commission from 1895 through 1911.
  is a  dreadnought battleship that was in commission from 1914 through 1948. In 1948, she was decommissioned and immediately became a museum ship near Houston.
  was in commission from 1977 through 1993. She was the second  nuclear-powered guided-missile cruiser.
  was commissioned in September 2006, and she is in active service in the U.S. Navy.

See also
 
 

United States Navy ship names